Psiloscirtus is a genus of short-horned grasshoppers in the family Acrididae. There are about seven described species in Psiloscirtus, found in Central and South America.

Species
These seven species belong to the genus Psiloscirtus:
 Psiloscirtus apterus (Scudder, 1875)  (Ecuador and Peru)
 Psiloscirtus bolivianus (Bruner, 1920)  (Bolivia)
 Psiloscirtus debilis (Rehn, 1913)  (Ecuador)
 Psiloscirtus flavipes (Giglio-Tos, 1898)  (Colombia and Ecuador)
 Psiloscirtus olivaceus Bruner, 1911  (Brazil)
 Psiloscirtus peruvianus (Bruner, 1910)  (Peru)
 Psiloscirtus splendidus Hebard, 1923  (Colombia)

References

External links

 

Acrididae